The 2009–10 season was Villarreal Club de Fútbol's 87th season in existence and the club's 10th consecutive season in the top flight of Spanish football. In addition to the domestic league, Villarreal participated in this season's editions of the Copa del Rey and the UEFA Europa League. The season covered the period from 1 July 2009 to 30 June 2010.

Players

First-team squad

Out on loan

Competitions

Overall record

La Liga

League table

Results summary

Results by round

Matches

Copa del Rey

Round of 32

Round of 16

UEFA Europa League

Play-off round

Group stage

Knockout phase

Round of 32

References

Villarreal CF seasons
Villarreal